Pachnodus velutinus was a species of air-breathing land snail, a terrestrial pulmonate gastropod mollusk in the family Cerastidae. This species was endemic to the Seychelles. It is now extinct.

Hybridisation with Pachnodus niger caused the extinction. Hybrids Pachnodus niger × velutinus still exist.

References

Cerastidae
Extinct gastropods
Gastropods described in 1841
Taxonomy articles created by Polbot